Peter Del Monte (29 July 1943 – 31 May 2021) was an Italian film director and screenwriter. He directed fifteen films between 1969 and 2021. His 1982 film Invitation au voyage won the prize for the Best Artistic Contribution at the 1982 Cannes Film Festival.

Filmography

 Fuoricampo (1969)
 Le parole a venire (1970)
 Le ultime lettere di Jacopo Ortis (1973)
 Irene, Irene (1975)
 L'altra donna (1980)
 Piso pisello (1982)
 Invitation au voyage (1982)
 Piccoli fuochi (1985)
 Giulia e Giulia (1987)
 Etoile (1988)
 Tracce di vita amorosa (1990)
 Compagna di viaggio (1996)
 La ballata dei lavavetri (1998)
 Controvento (2000)
 Nelle tue mani (2007)
 No one Can Brush My Hair Like the Wind (Nessuno mi pettina bene come il vento) (2014)

References

External links

No one Can Brush My Hair Like the Wind at Eurochannel

1943 births
2021 deaths
Italian film directors
Italian screenwriters
Italian film producers
Italian male screenwriters
Male actors from San Francisco